The 2021-22 Punjab State Super Football League was the 35th season of the Punjab State Super Football League, the top-tier football league in the Indian state of Punjab. Punjab Police are the defending champions. The league commenced from 21 September  2021.

Teams
A total number of 11 teams participated in the league.

Standings

See also
2021–22 season in state football leagues of India
2021–22 FD Senior Division
2022 Himachal Football League

References

Punjab State Super Football League
2021–22 in Indian football leagues
2021–22 in Indian football